"She's in Fashion" is the second single from Suede's fourth studio album, Head Music (1999). It was released on 21 June 1999 and peaked at number 13 on the UK Singles Chart, number 10 in Finland, and number 59 in Sweden.

Background and recording
A swirling synth line helps build the song into a dreamy, uptempo track, quite unlike anything the band had previously made. NME said the song "features oriental-type keyboards, and sounds like a cross between pop David Bowie and The Chi-Lites." "She's in Fashion" has been described as "the most summery-sounding pop song Suede have recorded." Obtaining this sound required months of heavy production work, several re-recordings and a lot of experimentation. Cowriter and keyboardist Neil Codling said the song was recorded in four different ways, describing it as "one of those stubborn songs [which] was determined to be a summer single."

"It happens quite often that you go on a journey, attempt various things and end up preferring the first thing you did," agreed producer Steve Osborne. "'Fashion' was a song that we started in the first week of recording -- but we didn't finish it until the very last week!"

Release and promotion
The band played the song live for the first time on TFI Friday on 4 June 1999. The single was released on 21 June 1999 and peaking at number 13 on the UK Singles Chart, thus breaking a run of six consecutive top-10 singles. It slid quickly out the charts, only spending six weeks in the top 100. It was also the group's last top-10 hit in Finland; a country where the singles from Coming Up had performed very well. Although it did not make the UK top 10, it received the most commercial airplay from Suede's discography. Saul Galpern of Nude Records said that "She's in Fashion" was Suede's biggest radio hit. However this exposure on the airwaves failed to transfer into sales and Galpern felt perhaps it should have been the first single. 

The single amassed unprecedented airplay for a hitherto indie band. Radio One and Atlantic 252, both played it 22 times the week before its release date. Zoe Ball, then presenting Radio 1 Breakfast, made it her Single of the Week, possibly associating with the song’s opening lyrics: "She's the face on the radio, she's the body on the morning show." Lead singer Brett Anderson said: "It did open us up to a mainstream that we hadn't been open to before [...] 'She's in Fashion' is probably our most famous song in a funny sort of way."

Music video
The video for the title song was directed by Johan Renck, and features Anderson riding in a car, focusing on a woman who re-appears outside in a different setting with different clothing. She is seen throwing out her garbage, taking her dog for a walk, standing among a flower field, sitting on a tree. She appears eleven times in different clothing. At the end of the video, Anderson turns his head to his right, and the girl is sitting next to him in the back seat. The video was filmed on the route from Eastbourne to London.

Critical reception
The song was well-received by critics, who welcomed the song's summery sound. Select declared it 'Single of the Month', writing: "Like  'Electricity' before it, 'She's in Fashion' is gloriously shallow pop music. With a keyboard figure from a Tunisian tourist-board ad, it’s about as summery as getting pissed at the fairground." NME liked the music, saying: "Soused in acoustic guitar'd empathy, with a vaporous keyboard motif inescapably reminiscent of Duran Duran's 'Save A Prayer', 'She's In Fashion' is a balmy, barmy beaut, shimmering grooves turning a blithe eye to the world." Music Week said it was "classic Suede – one of their best songs since 'Animal Nitrate' [...] It's a string-swept, breezy, car-roof-down-driving-around-the-French-Riviera number." 

In a more mixed assessment, The Times spoke favourably of the song's production, while criticising Anderson's lyrics, saying "it coasts along breezily on a wave of strings and synths that owe more than a passing nod to the Eighties electronica of bands such as the Human League. The feelgood, hands-in-the-air chorus is refreshingly upbeat after the tinny jangle of their last album, Coming Up, and the deliciously summery fade-out also scores extra brownie points. The only drawback, predictably, is Brett Anderson's unintentionally hilarious lyrics, full of the same tired old Suede reference points."

Track listings

UK CD1
 "She's in Fashion" 
 "Bored" 
 "Pieces of My Mind" 

UK CD2
 "She's in Fashion" 
 "Jubilee" 
 "God's Gift" 

UK cassette single
 "She's in Fashion" 
 "Down" (demo) 

European CD single
 "She's in Fashion" (radio edit) 
 "God's Gift" 

Japanese CD single
 "She's in Fashion"  – 4:53
 "Bored"  – 3:03
 "Pieces of My Mind"  – 4:42
 "Jubilee"  – 3:49
 "God's Gift"  – 3:03

Charts

References

1999 singles
1999 songs
Music videos directed by Johan Renck
Song recordings produced by Mick Glossop
Songs written by Brett Anderson
Songs written by Neil Codling
Suede (band) songs